The 2015 Furman Paladins team represented Furman University as a member of the Southern Conference (SoCon) during the 2015 NCAA Division I FCS football season. Led by fifth-year head coach Bruce Fowler, the Paladins compiled an overall record of 4–7 with a mark of 2–5 in conference play, tying for sixth place in the SoCon. The team played home games at Paladin Stadium in Greenville, South Carolina.

Schedule

References

Furman
Furman Paladins football seasons
Furman Paladins football